Chetyre Paltsa is a small island in the northern shores of Gizhigin Bay, Sea of Okhotsk. It is located 7 km west of the coast of the Varkhalamsky Peninsula.

Geography
Chetyre Paltsa is 800 m (2,600 ft) long and has a maximum width of 600 m (1,960 ft). The town of Evensk is located in the neighboring bay to the northwest.

Administratively Chetyre Paltsa belongs to the Magadan Oblast of the Russian Federation.

References

External links
 Russian Robinson Club
 Island list

Islands of the Sea of Okhotsk
Islands of the Russian Far East
Islands of Magadan Oblast